was a Japanese actor. His notable film appearances were Lone Wolf and Cub films, Stakeout, and Not Forgotten. 

Ōki started working as a shooting assistant at the Nikkatsu Tamagawa studio at the age of 16. In 1951, he made his film debut with Aa　Seishun at Shin Saburi and Michiyo Kogure's recommendation. In the same year, he officially signed his contract with Shochiku film company and became an actor. In 1963, he left Shochiku and  transferred to Toei. In Toei, he mainly appeared in yakuza films.

In 2000, he won the best actor award at the Three Continents Film Festival for his role in Not Forgotten. He died of pancreatic cancer in 2006.

Selected filmography

Films

 The Inposter (1952)
 Somewhere Beneath The Sky (1954)
 Lady and Rowdies (1955)
 I Will Buy You aka Anata Kaimasu (1956) as Goro Kurita
 The Gion Tempest (1958)
 Stakeout (1958)
 The Guitarist and the Rancher (1960)
 Chūshingura: Hana no Maki, Yuki no Maki (1962) as Toda
 Fukurō no Shiro (1963) as Gohei
 Tokyo-Hong Kong,Gangsters (1964)
 The Great Duel (1964)
 Kunoichi ninpō (1964) as Hayato
 Kaze no Bushi (1964)
 Kamikaze Man: Duel at Noon (1966) as Kitazawa
 Ninpō-chūshingura (1966) as Ōishi Kuranosuke
 The Chivalrous Life (1967) as Koike
 The Valiant Red Peony (1968) as Gōzō Kakui
 Horrors of Malformed Men (1969)
 Yakuza's Law: Yakuza Keibatsushi: Rinchi (1969)
 Lone Wolf and Cub: Baby Cart at the River Styx (1972)
 Lone Wolf and Cub: White Heaven in Hell (1974) as Yagyū Retsudō
 Lone Wolf and Cub: Baby Cart in the Land of Demons (1973) as Yagyū Retsudō
 The Originator of Kamikaze (1974)
 Gokuaku Kenpō (1974) as Kuroda
 Fossilized Wilderness (1982)
 Not Forgotten aka Wasurerarenu Hitobito (2000)
 Gokudō no Tsumatachi Jōen (2005)

Television
 Oshizamurai Kiichihōgan (1973-74) (ep.12, 25 and 26)
 Ronin of the Wilderness (1974) (2nd season ep.1)
 Hissatsu Shiokiya Kagyō (1975) (ep.11) as Saheiji
 Shin Hissatsu Shiokinin (1977) (ep.12 and 28)
 The Unfettered Shogun (1978) (ep.35) as Sagimiya Rihei
 The Yagyu Conspiracy (1979) (ep.25) as Araki Mataemon
 Hissatsu Shigotonin (1980) (ep.65) as Deikichi
 Sanga Moyu (1984) as Imoto Torazō
 Dokuganryū Masamune (1987) as Maeda Toshiie
 Choshichiro Edo Nikki (1988) (ep.18) as Matsudaira Morichika
 Onihei Hankachō (1997) (4th season ep.4) as Sōhachi
 Hōjō Tlokimune'' (2000) as Saionji Saneuji

References

External links
 

Japanese male film actors
20th-century Japanese male actors
1923 births
2009 deaths